Ochakov was a  of the Russian Navy Black Sea Fleet. She was decommissioned in 2011 but remained laid-up in Sevastopol, until on 3 March 2014 she was towed and sunk as a blockship in the channel to Donuzlav lake, in Novoozerne, in western Crimea. A few months later she was refloated and returned to Inkerman to await scrapping.

History 
Ochakov was laid down in the Soviet Union on 25 December 1969, launched on 30 April 1971, and commissioned in the Soviet Black Sea Fleet on 4 November 1973. The ship was constructed in the 61 Kommunar Shipyard at Nikolayev (Mykolaiv) on the Black Sea. She was in service with the Soviet Fleet until 1991, and then joined its successor, the Russian Navy. In 2000, the ship was laid up for modification and repairs. By 2006, all work on the ship had been halted, and, in 2008, the ship was towed from Sevmorzavod.

On 20 August 2011, the naval flag of Ochakov was hauled down and the ship prepared to be sold for scrap.

On 6 March 2014, during the annexation of Crimea by the Russian Federation, Russian sailors scuttled the hull of Ochakov in Donuzlav Lake at the entrance to Donuzlav Bay in western Crimea as a blockship, in an attempt to prevent Ukrainian Navy ships from gaining access to the Black Sea. Trapped in the bay, the Ukrainian squadron based at the Southern Naval Base surrendered without a shot being fired. The Ochakov was refloated several months later, and returned to Inkerman to await scrapping.

References

External links 
 Large Anti-Submarine Ships (Kara class)
 accessible skeleton service history

Kara-class cruisers
Ships built in the Soviet Union
1971 ships
Maritime incidents in 2014
Annexation of Crimea by the Russian Federation
Shipwrecks in the Black Sea
Scuttled vessels
Cruisers of the Russian Navy
Cold War cruisers of the Soviet Union
Ships built at Shipyard named after 61 Communards
Ships involved in the Russo-Ukrainian War
Shipwrecks of the Russo-Ukrainian War